William Foley (born 25 June 1960) is a Scottish former professional footballer who played as a forward.

Career
Foley had played for several non-league sides including Merthyr Tydfil, Barry Town United. He joined Frickley Athletic in 1985 and helped the side reach the third round of the FA Cup for the only time in the club's history. His performances led to him being signed by Football League side on non-contract terms in January 1986. He made his professional debut in a 4–1 defeat to Rotherham United and made four further appearances, scoring twice, before being released.

After briefly returning to his former side Frickley Athletic, he was offered a return to the Football League by Cardiff City on another non-contract deal in March 1986. The club suffered relegation at the end of the season and Foley was not retained. He returned to non-league football, later playing for several clubs including Newport County, Hereford United and Worcester City.

References

1960 births
Living people
Scottish footballers
Merthyr Tydfil F.C. players
Barry Town United F.C. players
Swansea City A.F.C. players
Frickley Athletic F.C. players
Cardiff City F.C. players
Newport County A.F.C. players
Hereford United F.C. players
Worcester City F.C. players
English Football League players
Association football forwards
Brecon Corinthians F.C. players
Pontllanfraith A.F.C. players